Adriana Jadranka Maraž (26 December 1931 – 8 May 2015) was a Slovene graphic artist. She was born in Ilirska Bistrica. From 1949 until 1957, she studied painting and graphic art with the professor Maksim Sedej at the Academy of Fine Arts (Akademija za likovno umetnost) (ALU) in Ljubljana. She had many solo exhibitions and has participated in the Graphic Art Biennales in Ljubljana. She won the Grand Prix at the second Norwegian International Print Biennale in Fredrikstad.

Maraž won the Jakopič award, the award for achievements in children's literature, in 1977 and the Prešeren Fund Award, the award for the artistic achievements, in 1983.

References

1931 births
2015 deaths
University of Ljubljana alumni
Slovenian painters
Jakopič Award laureates
People from Ilirska Bistrica
Slovenian women artists
20th-century women artists